Cape George (Scottish Gaelic: Ceap Sheòrais) is a cape in Antigonish County, Nova Scotia, Canada. It defines the northwestern limit of St. George's Bay. The communities of Cape George, Cape George Point, Morar and Livingstone Cove are situated on the cape.

The cape was named Cap St.Louis by the French. Early English maps mark it as Cape St. George. The original British grantees and settlers were of Scottish origin, many soldiers in the American Revolutionary War.

It is a large hub for the Nova Scotia lobster and tuna fishing industry.

References

 Cape George on Destination Nova Scotia

Communities in Antigonish County, Nova Scotia
George